This is the results breakdown of the local elections held in the Basque Country on 27 May 2007. The following tables show detailed results in the autonomous community's most populous municipalities, sorted alphabetically.

Overall

City control
The following table lists party control in the most populous municipalities, including provincial capitals (shown in bold). Gains for a party are displayed with the cell's background shaded in that party's colour.

Municipalities

Barakaldo
Population: 95,640

Basauri
Population: 43,626

Bilbao
Population: 354,145

Donostia-San Sebastián
Population: 183,308

Errenteria
Population: 37,853

Getxo
Population: 82,327

Irun
Population: 60,261

Portugalete
Population: 49,118

Santurtzi
Population: 47,320

Vitoria-Gasteiz
Population: 227,568

Juntas Generales

References

Basque Country
2007